Kapur is an Indian surname of Punjabi origin

Kapur may also refer to:

 Kapur (wood), a South-east Asian Dipterocarp hardwood
 9141 Kapur, an asteroid
 Kapur, West Kalimantan is an Indonesian town in West Kalimantan

See also

 Kapoor (disambiguation)
 Kapur Commission, a commission of inquiry into the assassination of Gandhi
 Camphor, a white transparent solid widely used in religious ceremonies in Hinduism